Pierre Charles Cior (1769 – after 1838), a French painter of historical subjects, portraits, and miniatures, was born in Paris in 1769. He was a pupil of Bauzin, and became miniature painter to the king of Spain. Died 1838.

References

 La miniature Française 1750-1825, Henri Bouchot, Goupil & Cie, Paris 1907
 Vente aux Enchères Cataloguée du 21 juin 1999, Christie's Londres
Attribution:
 

1769 births
Year of death unknown
Painters from Paris
18th-century French painters
French male painters
19th-century French painters
Portrait miniaturists
19th-century French male artists
18th-century French male artists